Jasmine Matthews (born 24 March 1993) is an English footballer who plays as a defender for Liverpool in the FA Women's Championship. She has previously played for Liverpool and represented England at under-17, under-19 and under-23 level.

Club career 
Matthews signed with Bristol City ahead of the 2011 FA WSL season. She made her debut for the senior squad during a match against Birmingham City L.F.C. on 14 April 2011. She made seven appearances during her first season with Bristol. The team finished in fifth place with a  record. During the 2012 FA WSL season, Matthews made seven appearances helping the team finish in fourth place with a  record.

In 2014, Matthews played for Bristol in the 2014–15 UEFA Women's Champions League. Bristol was the only English team to make the quarterfinals where they were eliminated by eventual winners Frankfurt.  In 2015, she competed in the 2015–16 UEFA Women's Champions League for the second time.

In July 2018, Matthews signed for Liverpool.

After one season with Liverpool, it was announced on 12 July 2019 that Matthews was returning to Bristol City ahead of the 2019–20 season.

International 
Matthews has represented England on the under-17, under-19 and under-23 national teams.

Honours 
 with Bristol City
 WSL Runner-up: 2013
 FA Women's Cup Runner-Up: 2012–2013

 with Liverpool FC
 FA Women's Championship: 2021–2022

See also

References

Further reading
 Caudwell, Jayne (2011), Women's Football in the UK: Continuing with Gender Analyses, Routledge, 
 Grainey, Timothy (2012), Beyond Bend It Like Beckham: The Global Phenomenon of Women's Soccer, University of Nebraska Press, 
 Scraton, S., Magee, J., Caudwell, J. (2008), Women, Football and Europe: Histories, Equity and Experience (Ifi) (Vol 1), Meyer & Meyer Fachverlag und Buchhandel GmbH, 
 Stewart, Barbara (2012), Women's Soccer: The Passionate Game, Greystone Books, 
 Williams, Jean (2003), A Game for Rough Girls?: A History of Women's Football in Britain, Routledge,

External links 
 
 England player profile
 Bristol City player profile
 

1993 births
Living people
Women's Super League players
Bristol Academy W.F.C. players
Bristol City W.F.C. players
Liverpool F.C. Women players
English women's footballers
Women's association football defenders
Women's association football midfielders